Ufi may refer to:
 Ufi Ltd, an educational non-governmental organisation of the United Kingdom
 Ufi, Iran, a village in Iran

UFI may refer to: 
 Unión del Fútbol del Interior, the Paraguayan football (soccer) governing body 
 Unique Feature Identifier, a globally unique geocode identification for geographical locations and features
 Unique formula identifier, alphanumeric code required on the label of products containing a hazardous mixture
 United Families International, a nonprofit organization in Gilbert
 Universal Filter Italiana S.p.A, a filtration technology and thermal management company based in Italy.

See also 
 Uffi (disambiguation)